"Beside You" is a single by New Zealand singer/songwriter Dave Dobbyn released in 1999 as the only single from his album The Islander. It reached No. 28 on the New Zealand music charts.

References

1999 singles
APRA Award winners
Dave Dobbyn songs
1999 songs
Sony BMG singles
Songs written by Dave Dobbyn